Diego Vázquez de Mercado' (1533 – June 12, 1616) was a Roman Catholic prelate who served as the Archbishop of the Roman Catholic Archdiocese of Manila (1608–1616) and the Bishop of the Diocese of Yucatán (1604–1608).

Biography
Diego Vázquez de Mercado was born in Alcaraz, Spain. At some point in time, he had tried to request admission into the Society of Jesus as a priest and as the dean of the cathedral chapter of Manila. On November 5, 1603, Pope Clement VIII appointed him Bishop of Yucatán, Mexico. He was consecrated bishop on June 13, 1604, by García de Santa María Mendoza y Zúñiga, Archbishop of México. May 28, 1608, Pope Paul V appointed him Archbishop of Manila.

While Archbishop, he was the principal consecrator of Pedro de Arce, Bishop of Cebu (1613), and principal co-consecrator of Alonso de Peralta, Archbishop of La Plata o Charcas (1609).

References

External links and additional sources
 (for Chronology of Bishops) 
 (for Chronology of Bishops) 
 (for Chronology of Bishops) 
 (for Chronology of Bishops) 

1533 births
1616 deaths
Filipino bishops
Bishops appointed by Pope Clement VIII
17th-century Roman Catholic bishops in the Philippines
Roman Catholic Archdiocese of Manila